The Miss Orlando competition began in 1933 as an official preliminary to the Miss Florida and Miss America competitions. David Wheeler is the executive director, as of January, 2023.

Winners: Miss Category (official Miss America Local annual operating reports)

References

External links
 

Beauty pageants in the United States
1933 establishments in Florida
American awards
Women in Florida